Suparna may refer to:

 Suparna Anand, Indian actor
 Garuda, divine bird in Hindu and Buddhist mythology
 Suparna Airlines, airline based in China
 Suparna (film), 2020 Sri Lankan movie